Claude "Auding" Peralta Bautista is a Filipino politician from the province of Davao Occidental, Philippines. He was first elected as Governor in 2016 and was re-elected in 2019. He was also the former Congressman of the province from 2001 to 2007.

References

External links
Province of Davao Occidental Official Website

Living people
People from Davao Occidental
Hugpong ng Pagbabago politicians
Year of birth missing (living people)
Governors of Davao Occidental
Members of the House of Representatives of the Philippines from Davao del Sur